Heaven Garcia (born June 8, 2000) is an American boxer. She participated at the 2018 AIBA Youth World Boxing Championships, being awarded the gold medal in the women's flyweight event. Garcia also participated at the 2018 Summer Youth Olympics, being awarded the bronze medal in the girls' flyweight event.

References

External links 

2000 births
Living people
Boxers from Los Angeles
American women boxers
Flyweight boxers
Boxers at the 2018 Summer Youth Olympics
Medalists at the 2018 Summer Youth Olympics
Youth and Junior World Boxing Championships medalists